The 2003 MTV Movie Awards was held on May 31, 2003 in Los Angeles. It was hosted by Seann William Scott and Justin Timberlake and featured performances by t.A.T.u., 50 Cent, and Pink. Colin Farrell was presented an award for Trans-Atlantic Breakthrough Performance by Victoria and David Beckham, although this award was not broadcast in the United States.
The show included a parody of The Matrix Reloaded, intercutting actual footage with new material from the hosts with appearances by Wanda Sykes as the Oracle and Will Ferrell as the Architect. The unedited version is featured in the DVD version of the film.

Performers
Pink — "Feel Good Time"
50 Cent — "In Da Club" / "Wanksta"
t.A.T.u. — "All the Things She Said" / "Not Gonna Get Us"

Presenters
Hugh Jackman and Famke Janssen — presented Breakthrough Female
Will Smith and Martin Lawrence — presented Best Comedic Performance
Samuel L. Jackson and Colin Farrell — presented Best Fight
Mark Wahlberg and Mýa — introduced Pink
Queen Latifah and Adrien Brody — presented Best Kiss
Jason Biggs and Alyson Hannigan — presented Best On-Screen Team
Sharon Osbourne — introduced 50 Cent
Beyoncé and Johnny Knoxville — presented Breakthrough Male
Roselyn Sánchez — introduced Ashton Kutcher and P. Diddy
Ashton Kutcher and P. Diddy — presented Best Villain
Paul Walker and Tyrese Gibson — presented Best Action Sequence
David and Victoria Beckham — presented Best Trans-Atlantic Performance (unaired)
Kate Hudson and Luke Wilson — presented Best Virtual Performance
Amanda Bynes and Hilary Duff — introduced t.A.T.u.
Harrison Ford and Josh Hartnett — presented Best Female Performance
Demi Moore — presented Best Male Performance
Keanu Reeves — presented Best Movie

Awards
References:

Best Movie
The Lord of the Rings: The Two Towers
Barbershop
8 Mile
The Ring
Spider-Man

Best Male Performance
Eminem – 8 Mile
Vin Diesel – XXX
Leonardo DiCaprio – Catch Me If You Can
Tobey Maguire – Spider-Man
Viggo Mortensen – The Lord of the Rings: The Two Towers

Best Female Performance
Kirsten Dunst – Spider-Man
Halle Berry – Die Another Day
Kate Hudson – How to Lose a Guy in 10 Days
Queen Latifah – Chicago
Reese Witherspoon – Sweet Home Alabama

Breakthrough Male
Eminem – 8 Mile
Nick Cannon – Drumline
Kieran Culkin – Igby Goes Down
Derek Luke – Antwone Fisher
Ryan Reynolds – National Lampoon's Van Wilder

Breakthrough Female
Jennifer Garner – Daredevil
Kate Bosworth – Blue Crush
Maggie Gyllenhaal – Secretary
Eve – Barbershop
Beyoncé – Austin Powers in Goldmember
Nia Vardalos – My Big Fat Greek Wedding

Best On-Screen Team
Elijah Wood, Sean Astin, and Gollum – The Lord of the Rings: The Two Towers
Kate Bosworth, Michelle Rodriguez and Sanoe Lake – Blue Crush
Jackie Chan and Owen Wilson – Shanghai Knights
Will Ferrell, Vince Vaughn and Luke Wilson – Old School
Johnny Knoxville, Bam Margera, Steve-O and Chris Pontius – Jackass: The Movie

Best Villain
Daveigh Chase – The Ring
Willem Dafoe – Spider-Man
Daniel Day-Lewis – Gangs of New York
Colin Farrell – Daredevil
Mike Myers – Austin Powers in Goldmember

Best Comedic Performance
Mike Myers – Austin Powers in Goldmember
Will Ferrell – Old School
Cedric the Entertainer – Barbershop
Johnny Knoxville – Jackass: The Movie
Adam Sandler – Mr. Deeds

Best Virtual Performance
Gollum – The Lord of the Rings: The Two Towers: When actor Andy Serkis (who played Gollum in the film) came up to the stage to accept his award, he gave a foul mouthed acceptance speech in character as Gollum that was so well received that it also later received an award of its own. The speech won the 2004 Hugo Award for Best Dramatic Presentation, Short Form.
Scooby-Doo – Scooby-Doo
Kangaroo Jack – Kangaroo Jack
Dobby – Harry Potter and the Chamber of Secrets
Yoda – Star Wars: Episode II – Attack of the Clones

Best Trans-Atlantic Performance
Colin Farrell – Phone Booth
Orlando Bloom – The Lord of the Rings: The Two Towers
Keira Knightley – Bend It Like Beckham
Jude Law – Road To Perdition
Rosamund Pike – Die Another Day

Best Kiss
Tobey Maguire and Kirsten Dunst – Spider-Man
Ben Affleck and Jennifer Garner – Daredevil
Nick Cannon and Zoe Saldana – Drumline
Leonardo DiCaprio and Cameron Diaz – Gangs of New York
Adam Sandler and Emily Watson – Punch-Drunk Love

Best Action Sequence
The Battle for Helms Deep – The Lord of the Rings: The Two Towers
Collision on Highway 23 – Final Destination 2
Escape on ATV's – Scooby-Doo
The Arena Conflict – Star Wars: Episode II – Attack of the Clones

Best Fight
Yoda vs. Christopher Lee – Star Wars: Episode II – Attack of the Clones
Jet Li vs. The Ultimate Fighters – Cradle 2 the Grave
Johnny Knoxville vs. Butterbean – Jackass: The Movie
Fann Wong vs. The Palace Intruders  – Shanghai Knights
Tobey Maguire vs. Willem Dafoe – Spider-Man

References

External links 
 2003 MTV Movie Awards on imdb 

 2003
Mtv Movie Awards
MTV Movie Awards
2003 in Los Angeles
2003 in American cinema